Harrow Central Mosque is a Sunni mosque and Islamic community hub in Harrow, England. The current centre opened in 2011 on no. 34 Station Road, adjacent to Harrow Civic Centre and a short distance south of Wealdstone town centre. The purpose-built facility was constructed as a replacement of a house-based mosque next to it, at no. 36 Station Road, which had been occupied by the mosque from 1985.

See also

 Islam in England
 Islamic schools and branches
 Islamism in London 
 List of mosques in the United Kingdom

References

External links

Harrow Central Mosque

2011 establishments in England
Buildings and structures in the London Borough of Harrow
Mosques completed in 2011
Mosques in London
Mosque buildings with domes